This is a list of all tornadoes that were confirmed by local offices of the National Weather Service in the United States from January to March 2009.

United States yearly total

January

January 3 event

January 6 event

January 7 event

January 10 event

January 24 event

February

February 9 event

February 10 event

February 11 event

February 18 event

February 19 event

February 27 event

February 28 event

March

Note: 4 tornadoes were confirmed in the final totals, but do not have a listed rating.

March 7 event

March 8 event

March 15 event

March 23 event

March 24 event

March 25–26 event

This event covers through the morning of March 26, which was due to a continuous bow echo/line.

March 26 event

March 27 event

March 28 event

March 29 event

March 31 event

See also
Tornadoes of 2009

Notes

References

Tornadoes of 2009
2009, 01
January 2009 events in the United States
February 2009 events in the United States
March 2009 events in the United States